Japan competed at the 2014 Winter Paralympics in Sochi, Russia, held between 7–16 March 2014.

Alpine skiing

Men

Women

Biathlon 

Men

Women

Cross-country skiing

Men

Women

Relay

See also
Japan at the Paralympics
Japan at the 2014 Winter Olympics

References

Nations at the 2014 Winter Paralympics
2014
Winter Paralympics